Daniel Patrick Adair (born February 19, 1975, in Vancouver) is a Canadian drummer. He is best known for his work with Nickelback and his previous work with 3 Doors Down. He also works with the Canadian band Suspect and the instrumental fusion band Martone.

Adair often uses a quote coined by Gary Player to describe his career: "The harder you work, the luckier you get."

Biography 
Adair auditioned for guitarist David Martone, a Berklee College of Music graduate, who was starting an instrumental fusion band. This band, named Martone, recorded its first album in 1999.

In 2002, Adair joined the multi-platinum, Mississippi-based band 3 Doors Down, as the touring and studio drummer. (Other drummers were used for video shoots and TV appearances.) During his time with the band they recorded the studio album Seventeen Days and live album Another 700 Miles, toured 14 countries and had multiple TV appearances.

Adair left 3 Doors Down to join the Canadian band Nickelback. In 2005, they released the album All the Right Reasons which debuted at #1 on Billboard and went multi-platinum.

On October 21, 2007, James Stephen Hart (former frontman of Eighteen Visions) announced that Adair was recording drum tracks for his new band, Burn Halo.

In 2008, Nickelback released their follow-up album Dark Horse and the first single on that album, "Gotta Be Somebody", was released on September 29 in North America. The album was produced by Mutt Lange.

In 2011, Adair along with the other band members of Nickelback released Here and Now. This album includes singles "This Means War" and "Bottoms Up".

Adair holds a private pilot licence, originally learning to fly on ultralight aircraft, and currently owns a Maule M-7. In 2020, Adair was diagnosed with radial tunnel syndrome.

Discography

References

External links 

1975 births
Living people
Canadian rock drummers
21st-century Canadian drummers
Canadian heavy metal drummers
Canadian male drummers
Musicians from Vancouver
Nickelback members
3 Doors Down members